Notable non-fiction environmental writers include:

American non-fiction environmental writers

Other non-fiction environmental writers

See also
List of environmental books

References

External links
Environmental Writers
How Writers Created the Environmental Movement - U.S. News & World Report

Non-fiction environmental
 
Non-fiction